Shamsabad (also Romanized as Shamsābād) is a village in Firuzbahram Rural District, Chahardangeh District, Eslamshahr County, Tehran Province, Iran. At the 2006 census, its population was 392, in 85 families.

References 

Populated places in Eslamshahr County